Sławomir Drabik (born 6 February 1966 in Jawor, Poland, is a former motorcycle speedway rider from Poland, who has won 1996 Speedway World Team Cup.

Career
He gained his Speedway licence in 1984.

Drabik was second in the 2003 Individual European Championship and 2007 European Pairs Championship. He was permanent rider of 1997 Speedway Grand Prix.

World Final Appearances
 1992 -  Wrocław, Olympic Stadium - 9th - 6pts

Speedway Grand Prix results

Speedway World Team Cup
 1996 - Winner - 27pts (12)

European Championships
Individual European Championship:
 2003 - 2nd - 12pts + 2pts
 2005 - 16th - 1pt

European Pairs Championship:
 2007 - 2nd - 22pts (9)

Polish Domestic competitions
Individual Polish Championship:
 1991 - Winner
 1996 - Winner
 1997 - 2nd
 Polish U-21 Championship:
 1986 - 3rd
 Poland Golden Helmet:
 1991 - Winner

Family
His son Maksym Drabik is a Polish international speedway rider and double Junior World champion.

See also
 Poland speedway team
 List of Speedway Grand Prix riders

References

1966 births
Living people
Polish speedway riders
Polish speedway champions
Poole Pirates riders
People from Jawor
Sportspeople from Lower Silesian Voivodeship